Briatico is a comune and coastal town in Calabria, Italy, in the Province of Vibo Valentia.  Briatico had an estimated population of 4,053.

Sources

Cities and towns in Calabria
Populated coastal places in Italy